Utharavu Maharaja  is a 2018 Tamil language film directed by Asif Kuraishi. The film stars Udhaya, who also produced the film, Priyanka Thimmesh, and Prabhu in the lead roles.

Cast
Udhaya as Ravi
Priyanka Thimmesh as Saadhana
Prabhu as Arun Bose
Nassar as M. Alagappan
Sriman 
Kovai Sarala
M. S. Bhaskar
Manobala
Sachu
Kutty Padmini
G. Dhananjayan

Soundtrack
Soundtrack was composed by Naren Balakumar. Karthi, Vivekh, Kovai Sarala, Arun Vijay, Sangeetha, Prem, Pasupathy and Sachu attended the audio launch.
"Yaar Da"  - Diwakar, Naren Balakumar
"Nyayam Dharmam" - Deepak, MC Ganee
"Enna Mayam" - Nivas, Padmaja

Release
The Times of India gave this film two out of five stars saying that "Utharavu Maharaja lacks the filmmaking panache that such a premise needs". On the contrary, News Today Net stated that "With a little more effort from the cast and scriptwriter, Utharavu Maharaja could have been even better. Nevertheless, the movie that starts off in a complicated structure, sets itself on track to end with its ideology conveyed well.". Cinema Express wrote "Utharavu Maharaja turns out to be a huge disappointment thanks to the hyperbolic performances, unrealistic staging and poorly-written dialogues".

Home Media

The Satellite Rights of the Film was acquired by Colors Tamil.

References

2010s Tamil-language films
Indian fantasy comedy films
Tamil-language psychological thriller films